The Guadalajara Open is a defunct men's tennis tournament that was played on the Grand Prix tennis circuit in 1978. The event was held in Guadalajara, Mexico and was played on outdoor clay courts. Unseeded Gene Mayer won the singles title while Sandy Mayer and Sherwood Stewart partnered to win the doubles title.

Guadalajara currently is host to the Abierto Zapopan and Guadalajara Open Akron.

Past finals

Singles

Doubles

References

External links
 Singles draw
 Doubles draw

Grand Prix tennis circuit
Tennis tournaments in Mexico
Clay court tennis tournaments
ATP Tour
Defunct tennis tournaments
Defunct sports competitions in Mexico